Tecmessa scitiscripta, the black-etched prominent,  is a moth of the  family Notodontidae. It is found from Quebec west to eastern Alberta, south to Florida and Texas, and was formerly placed in the genus Cerura, which is now restricted to the Old World.

The wingspan is 25–40 mm. Adults are on wing from March to October depending on the location. There are one or two generations per year depending on the location.

The larvae feed on the leaves of cherry, poplar and willow.

Subspecies
Tecmessa scitiscripta scitiscripta
Tecmessa scitiscripta multiscripta
Tecmessa scitiscripta canadensis

References

External links
Bug Guide
Moth Photographers Group - Tecmessa scitiscripta

Notodontidae
Moths described in 1865
Moths of North America